William Reese may refer to:

 William J. Reese (architect) (1943–2011), architect in The Hamptons area of New York
 William J. Reese (historian), historian of education and professor at the University of Wisconsin–Madison
 William L. Reese (1921–2017), American professor of philosophy
 William Oliver Reese (born 1987), American sailor who murdered a Japanese woman
 James W. Reese (1920–1943), American soldier and Medal of Honor recipient, went by his middle name "William"
 William Reese (murder victim), 4th of five victims of serial killer Andrew Cunanan
 Red Reese (William Bryan Reese), American college basketball coach and athletic director
 William S. Reese (1955–2018), antiquarian bookseller

See also
William Rees (disambiguation)